The Tour de las Américas de Squash is part of the PSA World Tour and consists of a series of professional squash tournaments held yearly in Argentina, Paraguay, Brazil and Bolivia.

2017

2018

References

PSA World Tour